is a pitcher for the Hiroshima Toyo Carp, one of six teams in the Central League of Nippon Professional Baseball. He was chosen by the Carp in the third round of the 2005 high school draft.

Career statistics (NPB)

External links
 

1987 births
Living people
Baseball people from Fukui Prefecture
Japanese baseball players
Nippon Professional Baseball pitchers
Hiroshima Toyo Carp players